Bashtin may refer to:
 Bashtin, Hormozgan (بشتين - Bashtīn)
 Bashtin, Razavi Khorasan (باشتين - Bāshtīn)
 Bashtin District, in Razavi Khorasan Province
 Bashtin Rural District, in Razavi Khorasan Province